Davide Bonora (born February 5, 1973) is an Italian former professional basketball player.

Professional career
Bonora played his whole career in Italy with the following clubs: Virtus Bologna, Scaligera Verona, Pallacanestro Treviso, Virtus Roma, Scandone Avellino, NSB Rieti, Reyer Venezia, Olimpia Matera and RB Montecatini.

While playing with Virtus Bologna, he won the 2001 Italian League championship, the 2001 and 2002 Italian Cups, and the 2001 EuroLeague. While playing with Pallacanestro Treviso, he won the 1997 Italian League championship, the 1997 Italian Supercup and the 1999 Saporta Cup.

National team career
Bonora played with the senior Italian national basketball team from 1995 till 1999. He won the gold medal at the Eurobasket 1999 and the silver medal at the EuroBasket 1997. He also played at the 1998 FIBA World Championship.

References

External links
Davide Bonora at legabasket.it
Davide Bonora at legaduebasket.it

1973 births
FIBA EuroBasket-winning players
Italian men's basketball players
Lega Basket Serie A players
Nuova AMG Sebastiani Basket Rieti players
Pallacanestro Treviso players
Pallacanestro Virtus Roma players
Point guards
Reyer Venezia players
Scaligera Basket Verona players
Sportspeople from Bologna
S.S. Felice Scandone players
Virtus Bologna players
Living people
1998 FIBA World Championship players